The P&G Alumni Network is a nonprofit organization founded by alumni to help former P&G employees stay connected. The network includes 50,000 former P&G employees and is one of the founding corporate alumni networks that later became commonplace.

The P&G Alumni Network is not formally connected with P&G, but the company provides support, financial assistance and allows the use of the P&G name.

In November 2018, P&G Alumni entered into a formal agreement with SAP & EnterpriseAlumni for the delivery of a new enterprise platform to manage the global community.

Annual event 
Since 2003, the P&G Alumni Network has held a Global Conference every 2 years.

 2003 Cincinnati
 2005 London, Great Britain
 2007 Cincinnati (hosted by the NYC chapter)
 2009 Rome, Italy (hosted by the Italy chapter)
 2011 Toronto, Canada (hosted by the Canada chapter)
 2013 Geneva, Switzerland (hosted by the Geneva chapter)
 2015 Miami, Florida (hosted by Miami Chapter)
 2017: Cincinnati, October 9-13, 3 day conference including guest speakers Meg Whitman, Scott Cook, Jim McNerney

P&G Alumni Foundation 
The P&G Alumni Foundation is the charitable arm of the P&G Alumni Network. It partners with charitable organizations that are meaningfully and actively supported by P&G Alumni. Annual fund raising efforts and donations are distributed by the Foundation, P&G Alumni must be actively and meaningfully involved with the charitable organization receiving a grant request. 

In 2017 $175,000 was awarded to 9 grant recipients from seven countries across four continents.

Founding 
The P&G Alumni Network was founded in 2001 by Ed Tazzia

References 

 
Alumni associations